Antero Lindman (born 25 December 1964) is a Finnish racewalker. He competed in the men's 50 kilometres walk at the 1996 Summer Olympics.

References

1964 births
Living people
Athletes (track and field) at the 1996 Summer Olympics
Finnish male racewalkers
Olympic athletes of Finland
Place of birth missing (living people)